The Westfield News is a daily newspaper published Monday through Friday afternoons, and Saturday mornings in Westfield, Massachusetts, United States, covering "Westfield, Southwick and the Hill Towns" of western Hampden County, Massachusetts.

The newspaper was purchased by Westfield native Patrick Berry in June 2011 from Allbritton Communications Company. Its circulation at the time was 4,500 daily.

Upon purchasing the newspaper, Berry introduced color printing for the first time—by retiring the News 1971 press and printing instead at The Republican in Springfield—and changed the paper's name from The Westfield Evening News in order to emphasize the all-day nature of the news cycle. He promised a new website and emphasis on social media such as Twitter and Facebook.

A web site, thewestfieldnews.com, was launched on June 4, 2012.

The newspaper was previously owned by Allbritton Communications, based in Washington, D.C.; it was the last traditional newspaper holding for the former Washington Star Company. 

Westfield News Group also publishes the Pennysaver in western Massachusetts and northern Connecticut and two weekly newspapers in the Westfield area:
 Longmeadow News of Longmeadow, Massachusetts, circulation 1,602 in 2007.
 Enfield Press of Enfield, Connecticut.

In July 2019, The Westfield News was purchased by Reminders Publishing, LLC (a subsidiary of The Republican).

References 

Newspapers published in Massachusetts
Mass media in Hampden County, Massachusetts